America is an American rock group who have released 23 studio albums, 11 live albums and 22 compilation albums. They have also issued 47 singles, including two Billboard Hot 100 and three Adult Contemporary number ones.

America's best-known song is their 1972 debut single, "A Horse with No Name". It was the lead-off single to their self-titled debut album. The song became their first number one on the Billboard Hot 100, and was also a Top 5 hit in the United Kingdom, where it reached number three on the UK Singles Chart. Throughout the 1970s and 1980s, America had charted eleven Top 40 singles in the United States. However, in the 1990s, their popularity began to fade. They have not had a Billboard charted single in the United States since 1984, though "Young Moon" charted in Germany in 1994, peaking at number 59 on the country's Media Control Charts along with hitting #33 on the Radio & Records AC Airplay Top 40 charts.  Additionally, in 1998 "From a Moving Train" charted on the Radio & Records AC Airplay Top 40 chart for six weeks and peaked at number 25, along with being #84 for the year.  "Winter Wonderland" peaked on the same chart at number 26 in 2002.

Studio albums

1970s

1980s

1990s

2000s, 2010s and 2020s

Compilation albums

1970–1999

2000s

Live albums

Bootleg albums

Singles

1970s singles

1980s singles

1990s singles

2000s singles

Billboard year-end positions

Notes

References

External links

Pop music group discographies
Discographies of American artists